The 1980 Illinois Fighting Illini football team was an American football team that represented the University of Illinois during the 1980 Big Ten Conference football season. The Illini finished in three-way tie for sixth place in the Big Ten Conference (Big Ten), compiled a 3–7–1 record (3–5 against Big Ten opponents), and outscored their opponents by a combined total of 326 to 241. The team played its home games at Memorial Stadium in Champaign, Illinois.

In December 1979, Illinois hired Mike White to replace Gary Moeller. Moeller's teams had gone 3-16-3 in the prior two seasons. White had been an assistant coach with the San Francisco 49ers in 1978 and 1979 and was the head coach for the California Golden Bears from 1972 to 1977. The 1980 season was Illinois' first under coach White.

The team's offensive leaders were quarterback Dave Wilson with 3,154 passing yards, running back Mike Holmes with 305 rushing yards, wide receiver Mike Martin with 555 receiving yards, and placekicker Mike Bass with 45 points. Wilson was selected as the team's most valuable player.

Several Illinois players also ranked among the Big Ten leaders in various statistical categories, including the following:
 Dave Wilson led the Big Ten with 245 pass completions, 463 pass attempts, and 503 total plays and ranked second with 3,154 passing yards, 19 passing touchdowns, and 2,960 total yards.
 Mike Martin ranked second in the Big Ten with 17.9 yard per reception and 8.2 yards per punt return, fourth with 123 punt return yards, and 10th with 555 receiving yards.

Preseason
In December 1979, Illinois hired Mike White to replace Gary Moeller. Moeller's teams had gone 3–16–3 in the prior two seasons. White had been an assistant coach with the San Francisco 49ers in 1978 and 1979 and was the head coach for the California Golden Bears from 1972 to 1977.

Schedule

Roster

Game summaries

Northwestern
On September 6, in the first game of the Big Ten season, Illinois defeated Northwestern, 35–9, at Memorial Stadium in Champaign, Illinois. It was Illinois' first game under new head coach Mike White and its first victory at Memorial Stadium since October 1977.

Michigan State
On September 13, Illinois defeated Michigan State, 20–17, to spoil Muddy Waters debut as the Spartans' head coach. Mike Bass kicked the game-winning field goal as time ran out.

at Missouri
On September 20, in the Illinois–Missouri football rivalry game, Illinois lost to Missouri (AP No. 15), 52–7, in Columbia, Missouri. The lopsided game was Illinois' first loss under new head coach Mike White. Missouri totaled 486 yards of total offense, including 105 rushing yards by running back James Wilder Sr.

Air Force
On September 27, Illinois and Air Force played to a 20–20 tie before a crowd of 45,638 at Memorial Stadium in Champaign. An inadvertent whistle saved the game for Illinois in the fourth quarter. With 6:12 left in the game and Illinois trailing, 20-17, Illinois quarterback fumbled into the arms of a defender, but the play was negated when officials ruled that the play should be replayed as the result of an "inadvertent" whistle blown during the play. Illinois then continued its drive which culminated in a Mike Bass field goal with 3:13 left in the game.

Mississippi State
On October 4, Illinois lost to Mississippi State, 28–21, before a crowd of 60,889 in Champaign. Illinois quarterback Dave Wilson set an Illinois single-game record with 23 completions and passed for 283 yards. Mississippi State scored its four touchdowns off two Illinois fumbles, an interception, and a blocked punt.

at Iowa
On October 11, Illinois defeated Iowa, 20–14, before a crowd of 59,780 at Kinnick Stadium in Iowa City. Illinois led, 20-0, early in the third quarter when Illinois cornerback Rick George returned a fumble 13 yards for a touchdown on the third play of the second half. Iowa then mounted a comeback that fell short. Keith Chappelle led the comeback effort, catching two touchdown passes in the second half. Chappelle broke an Iowa single-game record with 191 receiving yards and tied another with 11 receptions.

Purdue
On October 18, Purdue defeated Illinois, 45–20, before a crowd of 62,121 in Champaign. In a remarkable passing exhibition, the Big Ten single-game record for passing yardage was broken twice in the same game. Mark Herrmann broke the record first with 371 yards, surpassing the mark set two years earlier by Eddie Smith. Hermann went to the bench halfway through the fourth quarter, only to watch his record broken by Illinois quarterback Dave Wilson who tallied 425 passing yards as the Illini passed with abandon through the final minutes. Wilson also broke Big Ten single-game records with 58 passes and 35 completions.

at Michigan
On October 25, Michigan defeated Illinois, 45–14, before a homecoming crowd of 105,109 in Ann Arbor. The game had special significance, because Michigan assistant coaches Gary Moeller and Lloyd Carr had been fired by Illinois after the 1979 season. Rumors spread before the game that coach Schembechler wanted to "make Illinois pay" for the firings. Michigan back Stan Edwards and Lawrence Ricks rushed for 152 and 97 yards, respectively. Anthony Carter caught five passes for 121 yards and a touchdown in the first half. After the game, the Michigan players presented game balls to assistant coaches Moeller and Carr.

Minnesota
On November 1, Minnesota defeated Illinois, 21–18, before a homecoming crowd of 51,202 in Champaign. Illinois quarterback Dave Wilson completed 22 of 59 passes for 310 yards and two touchdowns. The game was marred by 12 fumbles and 22 penalties. Minnesota's running backs, Marion Barber, Jr. and Garry White rushed for 162 and 103 yards, respectively.

at Ohio State
On November 8, Ohio State (AP No. 7) narrowly defeated Illinois, 49–42, in Columbus. Illinois quarterback Dave Wilson set an NCAA single-season record with 621 passing yards. Art Schlichter threw four touchdown passes and broke the Ohio State career total yards record previously held by Archie Griffin.

at Indiana
On November 15, Indiana defeated Illinois, 26–24, in Bloomington. Indiana tailback Lonnie Johnson rushed for a school record 237 yards on 37 carries. Illinois quarterback Dave Wilson kept the game close as he passed for 403 yards and three touchdowns.

References

Illinois
Illinois Fighting Illini football seasons
Illinois Fighting Illini football